Teko is a 2019 Indian Bengali language drama directed by Abhimanyu Mukherjee and produced by Surinder Films. The film stars Ritwick Chakraborty and Srabanti Chatterjee in lead roles. The film will be released on 22 November 2019.
The story is all about Alokesh is obsessed with his hair, but in a twist of fate, he goes bald after applying an oil that’s touted to boost hair growth. Life deals a double blow when his hair-obsessed fiancée, Mina, calls off their wedding after he reveals his bald scalp to her. He then sets out to seek revenge.

Cast 

 Ritwick Chakraborty as Alokesh
 Srabanti Chatterjee as Mina
 Kanchan Mallick
 Sudeshna Roy
 Abhijeet Guha
 Manasi Sinha
 Buddhadeb Bhattacharya
 Aritro Dutta Banik
Shreema Bhattacherjee

Soundtrack

Release 
The trailer of the movie released on 19 October 2019.

References

External links 

2019 films
Indian drama films
Bengali-language Indian films
2010s Bengali-language films
2019 drama films